The Texas Coastal Bend, or just the Coastal Bend, is a geographical region in the US state of Texas. The name refers to the area being a curve along the Texas Gulf Coast of the Gulf of Mexico. The largest city of the Coastal Bend is Corpus Christi. It includes the Nueces Estuary (Corpus Christi Bay) and the Mission–Aransas Estuary (Aransas Bay), as well as part of Laguna Madre. The coastline is paralleled by several of the Texas barrier islands, including North Padre Island, Mustang Island, and San José Island.

The Coastal Bend consists of 9 counties: Aransas, Bee, Brooks, Jim Wells, Kenedy, Kleberg, Nueces, Refugio, and  San Patricio Counties.

Nature

The Coastal Bend is a habitat for many types of vegetation and wildlife. Aransas National Wildlife Refuge is among the most prominent centers for wildlife in the United States. Wildlife found in the area includes the rare whooping crane, American alligators, nine-banded armadillos, West Indian manatees, and numerous other species of wildlife.

The Texas Coastal Bend is an area of demarcation between ranges of various vegetative species. For example, the California fan palm (Washingtonia filifera) is found only west of the Texas Coastal Bend, or more specifically the Balcones Fault.

Estuaries
Two of the major estuary systems of Texas are found along the coastal bend: the Nueces Estuary (Corpus Christi Bay) and the Mission–Aransas Estuary (Aransas Bay). The United States Environmental Protection Agency has designated these Texas Coastal Bend Estuaries as an estuary system of national significance under the National Estuary Program.

See also
 Geography of Texas
 List of geographical regions in Texas
 List of regions of the United States#Texas

References
 C. Michael Hogan. 2009. California Fan Palm: Washingtonia filifera, GlobalTwitcher.com, ed. Nicklas Stromberg
 Roy L. Lehman, Ruth O'Brien, Tammy White. 2005. Plants of the Texas Coastal Bend, Texas A&M University Press, 352 pages  ,

Line notes

External links
 
 

Regions of Texas
Geography of Texas